Hendrik Storstein Spilker (born 1965) is a Norwegian sociologist and media studies scholar. He is a professor of media and technology at the Norwegian University of Science and Technology (NTNU).

Career
He earned his cand.polit. degree at NTNU in 1998 and his doctoral degree in sociology at the same institution in 2005, with a dissertation on the development of commercial Internet services in Norway from 1997. He was a postdoctoral researcher at NTNU from 2005 to 2007, when he became a tenured associate professor of sociology at NTNU. He was later promoted to full professor of media and technology.

He received the Article of the Year – Scandinavian University Press Academic Journal Prize in 2020.

References

Norwegian sociologists
Academic staff of the Norwegian University of Science and Technology
1965 births
Living people